This article comprises lists of National Basketball Association (NBA) players.

These lists include players from the American National Basketball League (NBL), the Basketball Association of America (BAA), and the original American Basketball Association (ABA).  All of these leagues contributed to the formation of the present-day NBA.

See also
 List of current NBA team rosters
 List of foreign NBA players
 List of National Basketball Association undrafted players
 List of NBA players who have spent their entire career with one franchise
 Naismith Memorial Basketball Hall of Fame
 50 Greatest Players in NBA History

External links
  NBA & ABA Player Directory @ basketball-reference.com
 NBL Player Directory @ basketball-reference.com